Hopea racophloea is a species of plant in the family Dipterocarpaceae. It is native to Kerala and Karnataka in India.

References

racophloea
Flora of Karnataka
Flora of Kerala
Endangered plants
Taxonomy articles created by Polbot